Agrabad Balika Bidyalay is a private girls school located at Agrabad, Chittagong, Bangladesh.

History
Agrabad Balika Bidyalay was established on February 8, 1981, at CDA residential area in south Agrabad.

References

External links 
 
 Agrabad Balika Bidyalay — Wikimapia

Buildings and structures in Agrabad
High schools in Bangladesh
Girls' schools in Bangladesh
Private schools in Bangladesh
Educational institutions established in 1981
Schools in Chittagong
1981 establishments in Bangladesh